Lamprosema argyropalis is a moth in the family Crambidae. It was described by George Hampson in 1908. It is found on Comoros (Mohéli, Mayotte, Anjouan) and in Madagascar.

References

Moths described in 1908
Lamprosema
Moths of Africa